Joe Donnelly (born 1955) is a former United States Senator from Indiana. Senator Donnelly may also refer to:

Davis A. Donnelly (1927–2020), Wisconsin State Senate
Ignatius L. Donnelly (1831–1901), Minnesota State Senate
Ken Donnelly (1950–2017), Massachusetts State Senate
Melinda Romero Donnelly (born 1971), Senate of Puerto Rico
Thomas F. Donnelly (New York City) (1863–1924), New York State Senate